Rajavinte Makan is a 1986 Indian Malayalam-language gangster film directed and produced by Thampi Kannanthanam from a screenplay by Dennis Joseph, based on the 1980 Rage of Angels by Sidney Sheldon. It stars Mohanlal as crime boss Vincent Gomes, and also features Ratheesh, Ambika and Mohan Jose in supporting roles. The film revolves around the rivalry between an underworld don, Vincent Gomes and the Home minister, N. Krishnadas. 

Kannanthanam's 1985 film Aa Neram Alppa Dooram was commercially unsuccessful, jeopardising his career. This led him to create his own production company, Sharon Pictures. It was shot extensively in and around Ernakulam. Filming began in early-1986, and took about one month to complete. The film was shot with a relatively small budget compared to films at the time as Kannanthanam was in financial crisis at the time. The soundtrack was composed by S. P. Venkatesh, cinematography was handled by Jayanan Vincent, and was edited by K. Sankunni.

Rajavinte Makan was released on 16 July 1986, and became a commercial success, running for 100 days in theatres. It was a turning point in Mohanlal's career, as it catapulted him into superstardom in Kerala. It was remade in Tamil as Makkal En Pakkam, and in Kannada as Athiratha Maharatha, with Ambika reprising her role in both the versions. It was also remade in Telugu as Ahuthi and in Hindi as Kanwarlal.

Plot 

The story begins with Krishnadas becoming the Kerala Minister of Home Affairs. After college graduation, Krishnadas started working for the crime boss Vincent Gomes. But soon, he cheats Gomes to gain favour among the people as well as the party. Thus, Krishnadas becomes the Home Affairs Minister of the state and becomes an enemy of Gomes. Gomes plans a payback and he successfully manages to do so by manipulating Nancy, an advocate who carries the case of his file which if submitted to the court may lead to imprisonment for several years. Gomes realises that Nancy has struggled a lot in life as an orphan and later, a single mother. However, because of Gomes's plan, Nancy loses her job. Gomes, now remorseful of his actions, makes amends to Nancy and become friends. He confesses to Nancy and tells her that he wants to halt all his activities, and asks for her hand in marriage. However, Nancy denies telling that she cannot accept anyone else as her husband.

Krishnadas goes after Gomes with his political power and Gomes ends up losing all his wealth. Gomes plans to kill Krishnadas and entrusts the duty to Kumar and Peter, the trusted gangsters of Gomes. But Kumar and Peter get killed during the assassination attempt against Krishnadas. The loss of his trusted friends makes Gomes extremely violent and vengeful. He alone drives towards the guest house where Krishnadas resides, opens fire and kills many policemen and Krishnadas's political aides. When he was about to kill Krishnadas, Nancy begs for Krishnadas's life and proclaims that Krishnadas is the father of her child. While Gomes stands stunned, cops reach the site and shoot and kill him. He dies before Nancy could do anything. The story ends as Nancy stares at a picture of Vincent Gomes.

Cast

Music 

The soundtrack features three songs composed by S. P. Venkatesh, with lyrics penned by Shibu Chakravarthy. Venkatesh got his break from this film.

Production

Development 
Thampi Kannanthanam and Dennis Joseph had earlier collaborated in the revenge drama, Aa Neram Alppa Dooram (1985). However, the film was a critical and commercial failure. Following this, Kannanthanam stopped receiving offers for direction from producers. This plunged him into financial crisis. Dennis Joseph had on the other hand established himself as one of the most sought after scriptwriters in the Malayalam film industry with the successes of Nirakkoottu and Shyama.

After talking with his friend, Joshiy, Kannanthanam decided to venture into production by directing his first production venture. On Joshiy's request Kannanthanam met Dennis Joseph in Madras (now known as Chennai) to brainstorm ideas for a new film. Joseph had suggested that they do a film set in a tribal background, similar to Madhumati (1958).  However, Kannanthanam wasn't keen on the idea as the theme had already been explored by J. Sasikumar, to whom he had served as assistant director, in Picnic (1975). Then, Joseph narrated the story of Rajavinte Makan to Kannanthanam. Since the story had its protagonist in an antihero role Joseph did not think the film could perform well at the box office. However, Kannanthanam liked the story and asked Joseph to prepare a script. The film's script took Joseph 5-6 days to complete.

Casting 
Dennis Joseph wanted Mammootty to play the role of Vincent Gomes in the film. He narrated the script to Mammootty, which the latter liked. However, on learning that the film was being produced and directed by Kannanthanam, Mammootty backed out. In a 2018 interview with Safari TV, Dennis Joseph told that the failure of Kannanthanam's Aa Neram Alppa Dooram affected Mammootty very much and he was not keen on working with Kannanthanam again. The incident created a permanent rift between them. Following Mammootty's rejection, they approached Mohanlal on the sets of Kariyilakkattu Pole, who was ready to do the film. This led to Joseph making modifications to the script to suit Mohanlal's style. To meet the film's budget Kannanthanam had to sell his car and ancestral property. The film also marked the debut of S. P. Venkatesh. The female lead was chosen to be Ambika. Her mother, Kallara Sarasamma told Thambi that he should pay her ₹1.25 Lakhs. However after a few days Ambika adjusted the amount to ₹1 Lakh. Mohanlal was paid a remuneration of ₹1 Lakh, the same as Ambika. 

For the role of Vincent Gomes' right hand man, Kannanthanam suggested a few names to Joseph. However, they rejected the role citing that they did not want to play right hand to Mohanlal. Joseph then suggested that the role be split into two. For one of them, Joseph suggested K. G. George's relative, Mohan Jose. For the second role, they decided to cast a new face. Gayathri Ashokan sent Joseph a few stills from the 1985 film Onnu Muthal Poojyam Vare featuring Suresh Gopi. Impressed by his looks, Kannanthanam called Gopi for an interview and was cast in the film. This was Suresh Gopi's first major role in Malayalam cinema.

Themes 
The basic plot of Rage of Angles by Sidney Sheldon was adapted by Joseph for Rajavinte Makan. However, the book has been uncredited. In Rage of Angels, the central character is a top female lawyer, Jennifer Parker who is torn between a top US senator and a mafia chief. Rajavinte Makan features a female prosecutor, Nancy who vacillates between the home minister, Krishnadas and the liquor baron, Vincent Gomes.  Sreedhar Pillai of India Today felt that the film showcased overtly political themes and also felt that the characters of Krishnadas and Vincent Gomes closely resembled former home minister Vayalar Ravi and liquor baron Chandrasenan. Writing for Full Picture, Aradhya Kurup wrote, "This uncredited adaptation is a toned-down version of the powerful narrative by Sheldon. One of the highlights of the film is the mafia don’s characterization — Vincent Gomez. He is a calmer version of the fierce Michael Moretti. Understandably, the cinema choses to glorify the don and cut down the heroine’s role."

Release
The film was released on 16 July 1986. The film was certified with a U certificate. In Kerala, the film was distributed by Joy Thomas through Jubilee Productions. After watching the film S. N. Swamy visited Joseph and told him that the film would be a failure at the box office. Swamy felt that the film's political theme was more suited for scriptwriters such as T. Damodaran. However the film was a major commercial success, completing a 100 day theatrical run.

According to a trade analysis written by Sridhar Pillai and published in India Today on February 28, 1987, Rajavinte Makan had a production cost of ₹ 15 lakhs and was expected to collect ₹ 75 lakhs by the end of its run. A second article published by Malayala Manorama much later on 2 October 2018, on the event of Kannanthanam's passing, cites the production and distribution budget as ₹40 lakhs, with a final gross of ₹85 lakhs at the box office.

Legacy
Rajavinte Makan is considered to be the turning point in Mohanlal's career as it shot him into superstardom in Malayalam cinema.  Even the dialogues from the movie are still famous today, such as: "My phone number is 2255." This dialogue was referenced in the 2022 film Aaraattu. The character of Vincent Gomes portrayed by Mohanlal has over the years attained a cult status in Malayalam cinema. In an interview, the writer Dennis Joseph states: "He is not one of those loud, flamboyant dons. He is soft-spoken yet menacing in an understated way. That’s what makes Vincent Gomez so iconic.” The film title design of Rajavinte Makan was reused for Kannanthanam's next project, Vazhiyorakkazhchakal (1987) believing it to be a sign of good luck.

Trivia
Thampi Kannanthanam's dream to remake Rajavinte Makan didn't succeed due to his failing health. 
Rajavinte Makan is also said to be a landmark film in Mohanlal's career as the film established the actor as the new superstar of Malayalam cinema. In fact, it was in the same year (1986), Mohanlal delivered 28 super hits at the box office.

References

External links 
 

1986 films
1980s Malayalam-language films
Malayalam films remade in other languages
Indian gangster films
Indian crime drama films
Indian action drama films
Films with screenplays by Dennis Joseph
Films directed by Thampi Kannanthanam
1980s action drama films
1986 crime drama films